"Está Llorando Mi Corazón" is a Spanish-language song written by Cuauhtémoc González García and recorded by Tierra Caliente group Beto y sus Canarios. 
It  is also the lead single from the 100% Tierra Caliente album. The song reached #1 on the Regional Mexican Airplay in late 2004. The song won the award for Regional Mexican Airplay of the Year by a Male Group at the 2005 Latin Billboard Music Awards.

The single peaked at No. 1 on the Oct. 16, 2004-dated chart, where it reigned for 12 weeks.

Awards

Chart performance

Weekly charts

Year-end charts

References

2004 songs
2004 singles
Beto y sus Canarios songs